Mark Windham is an American pathologist, currently a Distinguished Professor in Ornamental Pathology at University of Tennessee.

References

Year of birth missing (living people)
Living people
University of Tennessee faculty
American pathologists
North Carolina State University alumni
Mississippi State University alumni